Robert Eugene McKee Sr. (1889-1964) was an American construction contractor and founder of the Robert E. McKee General Contractor, Inc. company.

Life and career 
McKee was born in Chicago, Illinois, at a young age he and his family moved to St. Louis, Missouri. His father was accidentally killed when he was ten years old. McKee received his education from the Manual Training School of Washington University. After school he left St. Louis to live on his uncle's ranch in Elk, New Mexico. After a short stay at the ranch he moved to El Paso, Texas in 1910 to begin his career in the construction and engineering field. on September 20, 1911, he married Gladys Evelyn Woods the two would go on to have eight children. In 1913 he started his namesake construction company. His company quickly grew completing many projects in El Paso including the Knickerbocker Apartments. His company would later begin to expand opening additional offices in Dallas, Santa Fe, Los Angeles and Honolulu. McKee grew his company to build many large scale projects including hospitals, high-rises and government buildings other specialties included military installations including the Panama Canal Zone and Los Alamos, New Mexico. The stature of McKee as a contractor led to many clients including Conrad Hilton, and the United States Government. In 1950 McKee incorporated his company as Robert E. McKee General Contractor Inc. until that time he had been the largest individual contractor in the United States. After incorporating the company would grow to be the sixth largest construction company in the country. For the company's work at Los Alamos, New Mexico the employees were presented the Army-Navy "E" Award for excellence. The company was later managed by McKee's son Robert E. McKee Jr. McKee's wife Gladys died in 1960, McKee then remarried to Mary Grace Ross.

McKee died in El Paso on October 21, 1964, at the age of 75. After his death the company continued to build many large scale projects across the United States. The company was acquired by Santa Fe Industries in 1972. The McKee Construction Company would continue as a subsidiary of Santa Fe Industries. During the 1970s the company went under the name REMCON. In 1987 the McKee company was sold to Jacobs Engineering Group.

Selected works 

 Ft. Bayard Veterans Hospital, Ft. Bayard, New Mexico (1921-22)
 O. T. Bassett Tower El Paso, Texas (1929–30)
 United States Courthouse, El Paso, Texas (1936)
 Los Angeles Union Passenger Terminal, Los Angeles, California (1937–39)
 Additions to Hickam Field O'ahu, Hawaii (1939-1941)
 Nevada Test Site, Nye County, Nevada (1951)
 The Statler Hilton Hotel (later known as Wilshire Grand Hotel) Los Angeles, California (1952) - (Demolished)
 Nellis Air Force Base Ammunition Storage Depot, Clark County, Nevada (1953)
 Grady Memorial Hospital, Atlanta, Georgia (1954)
 United States Air Force Academy Cadet Quarters, Colorado Springs, Colorado (1956-58) 
 Los Angeles International Airport and Theme Building, Los Angeles, California (1957–61)
 United States Air Force Academy Planetarium, Colorado Springs, Colorado (1958)
 Federal Building, Little Rock, Arkansas (1959-61)
 Tucson House, Tucson, Arizona (1960–63)
 East-West Center, University of Hawaii, Honolulu, Hawaii (1961-62)
 Mount St. Joseph University, Cincinnati, Ohio (1961-62)
 One San Jacinto Plaza, El Paso, Texas (1961–62)
 Temple Mount Siani, El Paso, Texas (1962)
 Gammage Memorial Auditorium, Arizona State University, Tempe, Arizona (1962–64)
 Jack Langson Library, University of California, Irvine, California (1964–65)
 First National Bank Tower, Dallas, Texas (1965)
 Kaden Tower, Louisville, Kentucky (1965–66)
 Long Beach Veterans Hospital (additions and modernization) Long Beach, California (1965-68)
 Marin County Civic Center Hall of Justice, San Rafael, California (1965–69)
 Salt River Project Administration Building addition, Tempe, Arizona (1967)
 Cañada College, Redwood City, California (1967-68)
 Los Angeles Convention Center, Los Angeles, California (1969-71)
 Martin Luther King Jr. Hospital, Willowbrook, California (1969-72)
 John Fitzgerald Kennedy Memorial, Dallas, Texas (1970)
 El Paso Civic Center, El Paso, Texas (1970-72)
 Earl Cabell Federal Building, Dallas, Texas (1971)
 Wells Fargo Plaza, El Paso, Texas (1971)
 William Beaumont General Hospital, El Paso, Texas (1972)
 St. Vincent Medical Center, Los Angeles, California (1973)
 Cedars-Sinai Medical Center, Los Angeles, California (1972-76)
 Dallas City Hall, Dallas, Texas (1972–78)

References 

1889 births
American business executives
Washington University in St. Louis alumni
1964 deaths
Construction and civil engineering companies of the United States
20th-century American businesspeople
Businesspeople from El Paso, Texas